The 2022 Massachusetts Treasurer and Receiver-General election took place on November 8, 2022, to elect the Massachusetts Treasurer and Receiver-General. Incumbent Democratic Treasurer Deb Goldberg won re-election, and was challenged by Libertarian Cristina Crawford.

Democratic primary

Candidates

Nominee
Deb Goldberg, incumbent state treasurer

Results

Libertarian convention

Candidates

Nominee
Cristina Crawford

Republican primary

Candidates

Withdrew
Ron Beaty, former Barnstable County commissioner (running for Barnstable County Commission)

General election

Polling

Results

See also
 2022 Massachusetts elections
 2022 United States treasurer elections

References

External links
Official campaign websites
Deb Goldberg (D) for State Treasurer and Receiver-General
Cristina Crawford (L) for State Treasurer and Receiver-General

State Treasurer and Receiver-General
Massachusetts